Rudy Mater (born 13 October 1980 in Valenciennes) is a French football defender currently playing for SC Feignies in the French CFA 2.

External links

1980 births
Living people
Sportspeople from Valenciennes
French footballers
AS Cannes players
Valenciennes FC players
Ligue 1 players
Ligue 2 players
Entente Feignies Aulnoye FC players
Association football defenders
Footballers from Hauts-de-France